Christian Stanford Bergman (born May 4, 1988) is an American former professional baseball pitcher. He played in Major League Baseball (MLB) for the Colorado Rockies and Seattle Mariners.

Amateur career
Bergman attended St. Francis High School in La Canada, California, where he pitched and also played shortstop and third base. As a senior, Bergman went 10–2 with a 1.54 ERA, and also batted .343. After high school, Bergman attended the University of California, Irvine. As a freshman, Bergman went 0–4 with a 4.98 ERA. Bergman improved as a sophomore, going 5–2, compiling a 1.94 ERA, and a 0.64 ERA in conference play. During his junior season, Bergman held a record of 9-3 and had an ERA of 3.50. Bergman also went 9–3 with a 3.72 ERA as a senior.

Professional career

Colorado Rockies
Bergman was drafted by the Colorado Rockies in the 24th round of the 2010 Major League Baseball Draft out of University of California, Irvine. He was called up on June 9, 2014, and made his major league debut the same day. He got his first career win August 24, 2014 vs. the Miami Marlins. He pitched 6 1/3 innings and gave up 4 runs. The Rockies won the game 7–4. Bergman started 10 games for the Rockies, going 3–5 with a 5.93 ERA.

In 2015, Bergman pitched mainly out of the bullpen while also spot starting in 4 games for the Rockies.

Seattle Mariners
In December 2016, Bergman signed a minor league contract with the Seattle Mariners. He resigned a minor league deal on January 11, 2018. He declared free agency on October 2, 2018.

Chicago Cubs
On January 21, 2019, Bergman signed a minor league contract with the Chicago Cubs. He was released on March 20, 2019.

Seattle Mariners (second stint)
On April 15, 2019, Bergman signed with the Sugar Land Skeeters of the Atlantic League of Professional Baseball. The following day, prior to the start of the ALPB season, his contract was purchased by the Seattle Mariners. He was released on May 30, 2019.

Sugar Land Skeeters
On June 10, 2019, Bergman signed back with the Sugar Land Skeeters of the Atlantic League of Professional Baseball. He was released on July 12.

References

External links

UC Irvine Anteaters

1988 births
Living people
Sportspeople from Glendale, California
Baseball players from California
Major League Baseball pitchers
Colorado Rockies players
Seattle Mariners players
UC Irvine Anteaters baseball players
Casper Ghosts players
Tri-City Dust Devils players
Modesto Nuts players
Tulsa Drillers players
Colorado Springs Sky Sox players
Salt River Rafters players
Albuquerque Isotopes players
Tacoma Rainiers players
Sugar Land Skeeters players
Anchorage Bucs players